Gazipur-1 is a constituency represented in the Jatiya Sangsad (National Parliament) of Bangladesh since 2019 by AKM Mozammel Haque of the Awami League.

Members of Parliament

References 

Parliamentary constituencies in Bangladesh
Gazipur District